Shepherds Bush Housing Group is made up of two brands: Shepherds Bush Housing Association and BE WEST. SBHA is a community focussed housing association based in west London. Established by Reverend Asbridge in 1966, our vision today is as steadfast as it was then, for everybody in west London to have a safe and affordable place to call home.

History 
In the early 1960s members of St Stephen's Church in Shepherds Bush were concerned about the poor conditions in which many parishioners lived.  Vicar Reverend John Asbridge led a  group of individuals, drawn from the parish and elsewhere, to "acquire and administer property for letting to needy families." The trust's first property was 220 Hammersmith Grove, a handsome but rather run-down four-storey building which was converted into four flats.

The choir vestry at St Stephen’s was used as an office, which was run by volunteers from the parish. In addition, help was given by a number of parishioners who gifted their own houses to the association for use by homeless people.

Mission
The mission of the trust is to provide "affordable homes of quality". The trust helps to "regenerate neighbourhoods, help residents to live independently, provide a furniture re-use service and help people onto the property ladder through low-cost home ownership".

Today
Asbridge ran the Association for 20 years, retiring in 1988. Today, the Shepherd's Bush Housing Association owns and manages more than 5,000 homes.

References 
Byford, Juliet, History of St Stephen's Church Shepherd's Bush, official pamphlet published by St Stephen's Church, July 2017

Notes

External links
 Official Site Retrieved October 2017</ref>

Homelessness charities in the United Kingdom
Charities based in London
Housing organisations based in London
Housing associations based in England